Christopher Steven Morris (born October 7, 1949) is a former American football player. He played college football for Indiana and professional football in the National Football League (NFL) for the Cleveland Browns in 1972 and 1973 and the New Orleans Saints in 1975. He appeared in 22 NFL games, one of them as a starter. He also played for the Memphis Southmen in the World Football League in 1974.

References

1949 births
Living people
American football tackles
Cleveland Browns players
Memphis Southmen players
New Orleans Saints players
Indiana Hoosiers football players
Players of American football from Indianapolis